"Pacific Coast Highway" is the fifteenth single by the alternative rock group Hole. It is the second single from the band's fourth studio album Nobody's Daughter. It was released as a digital download on April 6, 2010, and was added on modern rock radio in the United States on May 5, 2010.

Background and history
"Pacific Coast Highway" was written by Courtney Love in a Los Angeles hotel on December 24, 2005. The song was later contributed to by the producer Linda Perry and Billy Corgan. In 2009, when being recorded as a Hole song, various new additions were made to the song, most notably a solo and a final bridge, both of which were written by the guitarist, Micko Larkin.

Critical reception
The track was described by NME as,
One of the earliest songs on the session, toughened up from the Perry era, this confessional song is nonetheless one of the record’s more plaintive moments, in the vein of 'Malibu'. Lyrically, it finally addresses the scars she still bears over her husband's death in the most brutal fashion: "I knew a boy who came from the sea/he was the only boy who ever knew the truth about me... I knew a boy who left me so ravaged/do you even know the extent of the damage? ... I'm overwhelmed and undersexed?/Baby what did you expect?/I'm overwrought and so disgraced/I'm too ashamed to show my face/And they're coming to take me away now/what I want I will never have/I'm on the Pacific Coast Highway/With your gun in my hand."
In its week of release it was the most added song to modern rock radio in the United States. An AOL exclusive acoustic performance video of the track was released as a part of the AOL Sessions, and "Pacific Coast Highway" peaked at #6 on the Billboard Top AOL Music Video chart in May 2010.

Track listingDigital single'''
 Pacific Coast Highway - 5:13

Music video
On May 24, 2010, Courtney Love wrote on Twitter'' that a promotional music video for "Pacific Coast Highway" was in the works.

Musicians and personnel
Courtney Love - vocals
Micko Larkin - guitars, additional producer
Shawn Dailey - bass guitar
Stu Fisher - drums
Jack Irons - additional drums
Jenni Muldaur - backing vocals
Michael Beinhorn - producer
Owen Lewis - assistant producer
Noah Goldstein - engineer
Ryan Gilligan - additional engineer
Ian Shea - additional engineer
Pete Bischof - additional engineer
D. Sardy - mixing

Release history

References

2010 singles
Hole (band) songs
Songs written by Billy Corgan
Songs written by Courtney Love
Song recordings produced by Michael Beinhorn
2010 songs
Mercury Records singles